Trinidad and Tobago Air Services also known as the TTAS, was an Air Bridge service for Trinidad and Tobago. It was based at Piarco International Airport, Trinidad and Tobago.

History
In 1974, TTAS was founded and owned by the Government of Trinidad and Tobago and the TTAS was the national flag carrier of Trinidad and Tobago.
In 1980, Trinidad and Tobago Air Services were merged with BWIA International Airways thus ending the TTAS operation.

Fleet 
The Trinidad and Tobago Air Services fleet included the following aircraft:

Services
Domestic scheduled destinations served by the air bridge service were Port of Spain, Trinidad (POS) and Scarborough, Tobago (TAB).

Destinations
Trinidad and Tobago
Trinidad
Piarco International Airport (Base)
Tobago
Arthur Napoleon Raymond Robinson International Airport

The December 15, 1976 Trinidad and Tobago Air Services timetable lists up to eight round trip flights a day operated with Hawker Siddeley HS 748 prop aircraft or McDonnell Douglas DC-9-50 jet aircraft between Port of Spain and Tobago.

Trinidad and Tobago Air Services McDonnell Douglas DC-9-50 jetliners were also operated in association with BWIA International  Airways on international services with these flights being listed in the September 15, 1976 BWIA system timetable.  Routings operated with the DC-9-50 at this time included Port of Spain (POS) - Tobago (TAB) - Antigua (ANU) - Miami (MIA) flown round trip twice a week and Port of Spain - Tobago - Caracas (CCS) also flown round trip twice a week.

See also
 BWIA International Airways

References

Defunct airlines of Trinidad and Tobago
Airlines established in 1974
BWIA West Indies Airways
1974 establishments in Trinidad and Tobago